Scopula omana is a moth of the  family Geometridae. It is found in the United Arab Emirates.

References

Moths described in 1977
omana
Moths of Asia